Pascal-Emmanuel Sinamoyi Tabu (13 November 1940 – 30 November 2013), better known as Tabu Ley Rochereau, was a leading African rumba singer-songwriter from the Democratic Republic of the Congo. He was the leader of Orchestre Afrisa International, as well as one of Africa's most influential vocalists and prolific songwriters. Along with guitarist Dr Nico Kasanda, Tabu Ley pioneered soukous (African rumba) and internationalised his music by fusing elements of Congolese folk music with Cuban, Caribbean and Latin American rumba. He has been described as "the Congolese personality who, along with Mobutu, marked Africa's 20th century history." He was dubbed "the African Elvis" by the Los Angeles Times. After the fall of the Mobutu regime, Tabu Ley also pursued a political career.  His musical career ran parallel to the other great Congolese rhumba bandleader and rival Franco Luambo Makiadi who ran the band TPOK Jazz throughout the 1960s, 1970s and '80s.

During his career, Tabu Ley composed up to 3,000 songs and produced 250 albums. In 2023, Rolling Stone ranked him at number 178 on its list of the 200 Greatest Singers of All Time.

Biography

Early career
Pascal-Emmanuel Sinamoyi Tabu was born in Bagata, in the then Belgian Congo. His musical career took off in 1956 when he sang with Joseph "Le Grand Kallé" Kabasele, and his band L'African Jazz. After finishing high school he joined the band as a full-time musician. Tabu Ley sang in the pan-African hit Indépendance Cha Cha which was composed by Grand Kallé for Congolese independence from Belgium in 1960, propelling Tabu Ley to instant fame. He remained with African Jazz until 1963 when he and Dr Nico Kasanda formed their own group, African Fiesta. Two years later, Tabu Ley and Dr. Nico split and Tabu Ley formed African Fiesta National, also known as African Fiesta Flash. The group became one of the most successful bands in African history, recording African classics like Afrika Mokili Mobimba, and surpassing record sales of one million copies by 1970. Papa Wemba and Sam Mangwana were among the many influential musicians that were part of the group. He adopted the stage name "Rochereau" after the French General Pierre Denfert-Rochereau, whose name he liked and whom he had studied in school.

Later career and exile

In 1970, Tabu Ley formed Orchestre Afrisa International, Afrisa being a combination of Africa and Éditions Isa, his record label. Along with Franco Luambo's TPOK Jazz, Afrisa was now one of Africa's greatest bands. They recorded hits such as "Sorozo", "Kaful Mayay", "Aon Aon", and "Mose Konzo". They performed also at the Zaire 74 and therefore are in the documentary film Soul Power.

In the mid 1980s Tabu Ley discovered a young talented singer and dancer, M'bilia Bel, who helped popularise his band further. M'bilia Bel became the first female soukous singer to gain acclaim throughout Africa. Tabu Ley and M'bilia Bel later married and had a daughter named Melody Tabu together. In 1988 Tabu Ley introduced another female vocalist known as Faya Tess, and M'bilia Bel left and continued to be successful on her own. After M'bilia Bel's departure, Afrisa's influence along with that of their rivals TPOK Jazz continued to wane as fans gravitated toward the faster version of soukous.

After the establishment of Mobutu Sese Seko regime in the Congo, he adopted the name "Tabu Ley" as part of Mobutu's "Zairization" of the country, but later went into exile in France in 1988. In 1985, the Government of the DRC banned all foreign music from the National Radio service. After Tabu Ley composed the song "Twende Nairobi" ("Let's go to Nairobi"), sung by M'bilia Bel, in praise of Kenyan president Daniel arap Moi, the ban was promptly lifted. In the early 1990s he briefly settled in Southern California. He began to tailor his music towards an International audience by including more English lyrics and by increasing more international dance styles such as Samba. He found success with the release of albums such as Muzina, Exil Ley, Africa worldwide, Babeti soukous, and Man from Kinshasa. The Mobutu regime banned his 1990 album "Trop, C'est Trop" as subversive. In 1996, Tabu Ley participated in the album Gombo Salsa by the salsa music project Africando. The song "Paquita" from that album is a remake of a song that he recorded in the late 1960s with African Fiesta.

Return from exile and death
When Mobutu was deposed in 1997, Tabu Ley returned to Kinshasa and took up a position as a cabinet minister in the government of new President Laurent Kabila. Following Kabila's death, Tabu Ley then joined the appointed transitional parliament created by Joseph Kabila, until it was dissolved following the establishment of the inclusive transitional institutions. In November 2005 Tabu Ley was appointed Vice-Governor of Kinshasa, a position devolved to his party, the Congolese Rally for Democracy (RCD) by the 2002 peace agreements. He also served as provincial minister of culture. In 2008, he was said to have fathered up to 102 children, including the French rapper Youssoupha and singer, composer Pegguy Tabu with different women.

Tabu Ley Rochereau died on 30 November 2013, aged 73, at Saint-Luc hospital in Brussels, Belgium where he had been undergoing treatment for a stroke he suffered in 2008. He was buried on 9 December 2013 in the Cimetière Acropolic de la N'sele in Kinshasa, after receiving an official mourning ceremony at the Palais du Peuple.

Discography
 Babeti Soukous (1989)
 Man from Kinshasa (1991)
Contributing artist
 The Rough Guide to Congo Gold (2008, World Music Network)

Awards
 Honorary Knight of Senegal
 Officer of the National Order, the Republic of Chad

References

Further reading

Tabu Ley at kenyapage.net
Rumba on the River
MusicWeb Encyclopaedia of Popular Music
Discography at mp3.com
Tabu Ley biography and discography at World Music Central

External links
 
 

1937 births
2013 deaths
People from Kwilu Province
20th-century Democratic Republic of the Congo male singers
Democratic Republic of the Congo songwriters
Soukous musicians
Rally for Congolese Democracy politicians
Government ministers of the Democratic Republic of the Congo